San Bellino is a comune (municipality) in the Province of Rovigo in the Italian region Veneto, located about  southwest of Venice and about  west of Rovigo.

Its Basilica di S. Bellino is a minor basilica by immemorial decree and its parish church in the Roman Catholic Diocese of Adria-Rovigo.

Shares with Castelguglielmo, to being the home of the second largest solar park in Italy: the 70 MWp San Bellino Photovoltaic Power Plant.

Geography 
The municipality of San Bellino contains the frazioni (subdivisions, mainly villages and hamlets) Borgo di Mezzo, Borgo Due Spade, Borgo Vespara, Ca'moro-Dona, Ca'Peretto, Case Nuove, Passarara, Presciane and Treponti.

San Bellino borders the following municipalities: Castelguglielmo, Fratta Polesine, Lendinara and Pincara.

Statistics 

Demographic evolution

References

Sources and external links
 www.comune.sanbellino.ro.it/
 GCatholic San Bellino basilica

Cities and towns in Veneto